Matheus Nascimento de Paula (born 3 March 2004) is a Brazilian footballer who currently plays as a forward for Botafogo.

Club career 
Originally a member of the Trops youth development center (based in Niterói, Rio de Janeiro) Matheus joined Botafogo at the age of 11, thanks to a partnership between the school and the fellow Carioca club. He quickly established himself as one of the most promising prospects in the team's academy ever since, having scored more than 150 goals with several different formations.

Following his impressive performances in the youth sector, in 2020 Matheus was first introduced to Botafogo's first team during their campaign in the Campeonato Brasileiro Série A, and signed his first professional contract on June 12, establishing his link with the club until 2023. Some months after, on September 6, he proceeded to make his professional debut, coming in for Matheus Babi at the 80th minute of a 2-2 away draw against Corinthians: at 16 years, 6 months and 3 days, he also became the youngest player ever to get on the pitch for the Rio-based team.

Although he eventually got involved in Botafogo's third relegation to the Série B, Matheus still managed to get his first feature in the starting XI, as well: in fact, as Alexander Lecaros got ruled out after testing positive for COVID-19, on January 20, 2021 Matheus was chosen to start the home match against Atlético Goianiense, which ended in a 1-3 loss for his side.

Career statistics

Club

Notes

Honours
Botafogo
 Campeonato Brasileiro Série B: 2021

References

2004 births
Living people
Brazilian footballers
Brazil youth international footballers
Association football forwards
Campeonato Brasileiro Série A players
Campeonato Brasileiro Série B players
Botafogo de Futebol e Regatas players
Footballers from Rio de Janeiro (city)